Jagame Thandhiram is a 2021 Indian Tamil-language action thriller film written and directed by Karthik Subbaraj and produced by YNOT Studios and Reliance Entertainment. The film stars Dhanush, James Cosmo, Joju George, Aishwarya Lekshmi and Kalaiyarasan. It marks the Indian film debut of James Cosmo and the Tamil debut of Joju George. It follows Suruli, a carefree gangster in Madurai, who is recruited to help an overseas crime lord take down a rival, but later caught off guard by the moral dilemmas that follow.

The project was initially announced in April 2016 with Thenandal Studio Limited bagging the project, but eventually got shelved due to the financial problems surrounding over the production house. It was revived once again in February 2018, with YNOT Studios acquiring the rights for film production. After an official launch in July 2019, the film began production in September 2019, with shooting taking place across London, Madurai, Rameshwaram and Jaipur and wrapped within December 2019. The songs and background score was composed by Santhosh Narayanan, while cinematography handled by Shreyas Krishna and editing done by Vivek Harshan.

Jagame Thandhiram was scheduled for a theatrical release on 1 May 2020, but was delayed indefinitely due to the COVID-19 pandemic. While the makers initially planned on releasing the film only in theatres, this decision was dropped in February 2021 in favour of a worldwide digital release through Netflix on 18 June 2021. It was dubbed and released in 17 languages, across 190 countries. The film received mixed reviews from critics and audiences, praising the cast's performances (notably Dhanush, James Cosmo and Joju George), cinematography, technical aspects, soundtrack and musical score but criticized the film's pacing, writing and editing.

Plot 
Suruli is a gangster from Madurai who runs a parotta restaurant. Due to his thug-like behaviour, he is unable to find a bride and even when his marriage is fixed, the bride runs away when she finds out about his criminal background. His notoriety comes to the attention of an Englishman named John, who is a right-hand man of a London-based white supremacist don named Peter Sprott. John offers £ per week to Suruli if he works for Peter against a rival don Sivadoss, who is Peter's arch-nemesis and has considerable influence among London's Tamil-speaking population. Suruli accepts the offer with the intention to use the money to eventually settle down and give up his criminal activities, and leaves for London where he learns more about Sivadoss and his gang as well as their activities which involve smuggling weapons from conflict-ridden countries in exchange for money.

Peter's gang, led by Suruli and John, raid Sivadoss's boat yard where the smuggling is in process under Sivadoss's right-hand man Rajan. During the raid, Suruli kills Rajan as well. Sivadoss and his gang realise that Suruli is responsible for killing Rajan and kidnap him. Suruli and Sivadoss negotiate to kill Peter under the ruse of inviting him for a "peace talk" to end their feud, in exchange for £ as well as a parotta restaurant in London, but during the "peace talk", Suruli betrays Sivadoss and hands over an aruval to Peter, who uses it to hack Sivadoss to death. As a reward for Sivadoss's death, Peter offers Suruli a designated area in London to start his business and allow Tamils to live there, and christens the area Little Madurai. Meanwhile, Suruli falls in love with Attila, a Sri Lankan Tamil singer. When he initially approaches Attila, she reveals that she is a widow with a seven-year-old son named Dheeran.

However, she soon reciprocates Suruli's feelings. While on a date at a park, they are attacked by Sivadoss's remaining henchmen Deepan and Dharani, who have sworn to take revenge on Suruli for betraying and helping Peter to kill Sivadoss. Deepan shoots Suruli, leaving him critically wounded. However, he soon manages to recover under Attila's care. But one day, he captures her after she injects a mysterious drug into his drip bag with the intention to kill him. When confronted, Attila reveals why she wants to kill him. Attila, Dheeran and Attila's brother are the only survivors of an aerial attack on their village in Sri Lanka during the Sri Lankan Civil War. It is also revealed that Dheeran is not Attila's son, but her brother's son. At a refugee camp, they are convinced by Sivadoss's aide to join Sivadoss's gang, who would help them move to London under the guise of husband, wife and child and are offered fake passports.

On the way, Attila's brother is caught and thrown into Peter's private prison, which is used to hold refugees and illegal immigrants, but Attila and Dheeran safely make it to London. Attila further reveals that Sivadoss was involved in smuggling with the intention to use the money to help the illegal immigrants and refugees from all countries financially and legally, and was planning to fight for her brother's release as well. Sivadoss, on hearing about Suruli's love for Attila, decided to offer him protection and get him married to Attila. But due to Sivadoss's death, the money to fight for the immigrants' rights had dried up, and Attila's brother has no chance of being released from prison as a result. Hence, Attila had planned the encounter in the park between Suruli, Deepan and Dharani with the intention to kill Suruli, but she still saved him due to her love for him.

Suruli also learns about a bill pending in the British parliament called BICORE, whose purpose is for restricting immigration and is being pushed by Peter and a few other lawmakers. If passed, most of the refugees and illegal immigrants would be deported or thrown into prisons, which would benefit Peter. On hearing this, Suruli has a change of heart and decides to help Attila, Deepan and Dharani in their fight against Peter and BICORE. With the help of Deepan and Dharani, he manages to recover the money which Sivadoss had acquired for the immigrants, and this money is used to release some of the immigrants, including Attila's brother. Suruli and Attila resume their relationship.

Meanwhile, Peter asks Suruli to travel to Birmingham to kill Andrews, a minister who is against BICORE. Suruli realises that Peter wants him to kill Andrews so that his death can be blamed on an immigrant, and thus BICORE would gain more support and be passed in Parliament. He refuses to kill Andrews. In retribution, Peter, John and their men attack Little Madurai and, in the process, kill Suruli's close friend Murugesan. With no other option, Suruli's accepts Peter's demands and leaves for Birmingham. However, during the journey, Suruli, Deepan and Dharani kill John and head for Peter's mansion instead. They manage to shoot down Peter's goons and barge into Peter's room. Despite Deepan and Dharani wanting to kill Peter, Suruli decides against it and instead transports Peter to a remote land on the Afghanistan–Iran border. Suruli, Deepan and Dharani then destroy all proof of Peter's British citizenship, offer him a fake passport from the "Republic of Mattuthavani", and leave him there to live as a stateless refugee forever.

Cast

Production

Development 
During March 2015, Karthik Subbaraj planned for a gangster film set in foreign locations, when he attended the special screening of Jigarthanda at a film festival in New York. He was inspired by popular crime films such as The Godfather, The Irishman, Once Upon a Time in America and Casino, and with this he planned to come up with a script, bridging the gap of a gangster from New York and a man from Madurai, with the issue of foreign immigrants being set as the subplot. Subbaraj wrote the script with Dhanush and Hollywood actor Robert De Niro in mind, and happened to approach the former in April 2016. Dhanush agreed to produce the film under the actor's home banner Wunderbar Films, apart from playing the lead. The makers unsuccessfully approached Hollywood actors Morgan Freeman, Robert De Niro and Al Pacino about playing a key role in the film during October 2016. Subbaraj later lamented that the process of reaching out to the actors was difficult, and that it was often difficult to get past casting agents.

The rights for the film's production were later exchanged to Thenandal Studio Limited in April 2017, and the company, opted to prioritise the making of other big-budget films such as Mersal and Sangamithra. However, soon after the release of Mersal, the company ran into financial problems and eventually shelved the project. S. Sashikanth of YNOT Studios, acquired the rights for the film's production and the project was revived in February 2018. Subbaraj planned to make changes in the story as well as the location settings, in order to reduce the film's production costs, in which the gangster story being set in London instead of New York, and also added that the film's shooting will take place after his completion of Rajinikanth's Petta as well as Dhanush's commitments in other projects. On 19 July 2019, Sashikanth officially announced the project's launch, titled as #D40 with Subbaraj's regular collaborator, Santhosh Narayanan scoring the music, as well as cinematographer Shreyaas Krishna and editor Vivek Harshan, who worked with the director's previous projects Jigarthanda, Iraivi, Mercury and Petta.

While the film was tentatively titled as #D40, there were rumours claiming that the film's title was Suruli or Ulagam Suttrum Vaaliban (referring to the 1975 film of the same name), whereas Sashikanth claimed that there is no official announcement regarding the film's title. The film's title Jagame Thandhiram was announced during the release of the film's motion poster on 19 February 2020, referring to a line from the song "Sambo Siva Sambo", written by Kannadasan, from the 1979 film Ninaithale Inikkum. Karthik Subbaraj initially considered Suruli as the film's title, but one day, he happened to listen to the Ninaithale Inikkum song, and also being a fan of Rajinikanth, the director felt that the Jagame Thandhiram would be the apt title for his script.

Casting 
In an interview with The Times of India, Karthik Subbaraj eventually stated that "The process of finalising an actor in Hollywood is going through a casting agent. Once the casting agent is impressed with the script, the makers need to make an offer and the number of days required for shooting, after which the actor will have three weeks' time to accept or reject the offer. Only after the three weeks can the makers approach another actor." In mid-April 2018, Pierce Brosnan was reportedly approached for a role in the film, after Robert De Niro and Al Pacino, but it was later proved to be false. During the official announcement of the project, it was reported that Malayalam actress Aishwarya Lekshmi will play the female lead, in her second Tamil film, after Vishal's Action (2019). In September 2019, British actor James Cosmo (of Game of Thrones fame) signed up for the character Peter Sprott, in his Indian film debut. Joju George, Kalaiyarasan and Roman Fiori were also confirmed in the film's cast in the same month.

Initially SJ Suryah was approached to play the main antagonist Sivadoss, but the role went to George, marking his Tamil debut. George initially stated that he admired Karthik Subbaraj's works after his directorial debut with Pizza (2012) and tried to approach Subbaraj, but he couldn't get a chance. He stated that "Karthik asked me to audition for this role since it was a huge character. He narrated a scene and asked me to act. I acted it out and said the dialogues in broken Tamil. He simply smiled at me, and I was so happy." Similarly, Cosmo, who made his Indian film debut with this film, had said that he was impressed by the narration of Karthik Subbaraj and decided to act in the film. He also shot for few scenes in Rajasthan during this schedule. About his character, he stated that "The character I play is that of a powerful gangster in London. He employs the character played by Dhanush to fix the problems created by Indian gangs in London. During the course of this, he grows fond of Dhanush, which changes the whole dynamics of his gang. That's how the story moves forward."

Filming 
Principal photography began on 24 September 2019, in Aldgate East, London. The crew filmed for about a week, before the makers planned to shoot the entire stretch of portions in London, within a single schedule of 20 days. However, on 7 November 2019, the makers announced that they have completed the London schedule within 64 days. In 9 November, the makers headed to India, to shoot major portions of the film in Madurai and parts of Rajasthan. The entire principal photography process wrapped on 13 January 2020, with Dhanush, stating it as one of his "quickest film in his career" as the film was shot within a span of four months. The film's post-production process took place in London in January 2020, post the completion of the film's shoot. However, it was put on hold, as the production house suspended the works of their projects, including production and promotional activities, due to the COVID-19 pandemic; It later resumed in May 2020, as the Tamil Nadu government granted permission for the film industry to resume post-production works. The film's final duration for Netflix's version was about 158 minutes, with an 18+ rating (adult certificate) due to violence and abusive words; three songs and sequences were removed to follow the platform's guidelines. However, its televised version has a duration of 165 minutes, with the deleted songs and sequences being featured, and also bleeping the abusive language and violence.

Themes 
Karthik Subbaraj revealed in an interview that Jagame Thandhiram, apart from being a gangster film, explores the themes of xenophobia, cultural shifts, and also what the meaning of ‘home’ is to different people. He added the film "started off as a gangster story initially, where two explosive personalities face off against each other; one from the Western world and one from Madurai. After that, the script demanded we go to a foreign land and shoot there; we didn't travel to London just for the sake of fancy locations. The themes explored in the film are very, very real and something that is very relevant and happening to all of us right now. Most of us... we’re all lucky to say that this is the land we belong to, and this is our home country. But there is a different world, where it is tough for many people to even identify what their idea of ‘home’ is, where they come from and most importantly, where they belong."

In a live conversation with his fans through Twitter Spaces, Dhanush said that the character Suruli will have "shades of Rajinikanth's mannerisms in the film", Subbaraj, Dhanush and Joju George were fans of Rajinikanth. Eventually Dhanush stayed away from imitating Rajinikanth's mannerisms in his earlier films, due to his change in script selections, but Karthik Subbaraj had said "Let Rajini be there". The film further deals with the conflict between the Sri Lankan government and the Liberation Tigers of Tamil Eelam, which led to Sri Lankan Civil War, and sufferings of the Eelam Tamils as refugees and immigrants, as Subbaraj had stated that it is about "man-made boundaries and whether homes unite or separate".

Speaking about the film's script, Subbaraj, in an interview to LetsOTT had stated that "gangster films have more scope for unpredictability". He added that films such as "The Godfather and Scarface are not only based on violence, but also about the emotions they connect with the storyline. While the former is based on the legacy, the latter is about brother-sister sentiment" and further believed that "a strong emotion connected with any story has more scope to connect with the audiences".

Music 

The soundtrack to Jagame Thandhiram featured 11 tracks; eight songs, and three instrumentals, all of them being composed by Santhosh Narayanan. Lyrics for the songs were written by Vivek, Dhanush, Arivu, Anthony Daasan and Madurai Babaraj. According to Santhosh, as "the film is British in many ways", he got an opportunity to collaborate with British and Scottish folk bands and musicians, while also exploring Madurai's folk music. "Rakita Rakita" being the first song from the film was recorded live outside his studio, since he "wanted the song to be a listener's experience". "Rakita Rakita" was released as the film's first single on 28 July 2020, coinciding with Dhanush's birthday. Dhanush himself sang the song, with additional vocals provided by Santhosh Narayanan and Dhee.

The second single titled "Bujji", sung by Anirudh Ravichander, was released during the eve of Diwali day, on 13 November 2020. The third single "Nethu" which was sung and written by Dhanush, was released on 22 May 2021. Director Karthik Subbaraj had stated that the songs "Bujji" and "Nethu", along with the fourth song from the film titled "Aala Ola" will not be featured in the film and they are used only for promotional purposes, but he assured that the songs will be present in the film's television premiere. The soundtrack album was launched by Sony Music on 6 June 2021 in Tamil and Telugu languages, through music streaming platforms.

The soundtrack opened to positive response from critics and audiences. Dhanush, Karthik Subbaraj, Santhosh Narayanan and the musical team of Jagame Thandhiram conducted a session on 7 June through Twitter Spaces in order to celebrate the soundtrack's success; thus being the maiden entry of a South Indian actor through the live-audio conversation platform. It was the highest attended Twitter Spaces session with 17,000 participants, until it was broken by #CelebrateThalapathyWithRoute, another session which had 27,600 listeners.

== Release ==

Streaming 
Jagame Thandhiram was initially scheduled to release on 1 May 2020, but was then indefinitely delayed due to the COVID-19 pandemic. The producers themselves confirmed that the film will be scheduled for a theatrical release, refuting the rumours of releasing through over-the-top media service platforms. In January 2021, the film was planned for a February release which did not happen, as media reports claimed that the film will be scheduled for a direct release through the streaming platform Netflix.

Without any pre-announcement, on 22 February 2021, the teaser trailer for the film was unveiled by Netflix India, through their official YouTube channel, thus confirming the release through the streaming platform. It was initially slated to be released on the last week of March 2021, However, the release was not confirmed during their announcement of Indian originals for the 2021 slate of Netflix.

On 27 April 2021, the makers announced that Jagame Thandhiram will release on 18 June 2021. Irrespective of being dubbed in Telugu (as Jagame Tantram), Malayalam, Kannada and Hindi languages, the makers further announced that the film will be dubbed and released in 17 languages, the first time for a Tamil film, so as to be premiered in over 190 countries through Netflix. The film released on 18 June, along with dubbed versions in Malayalam, Kannada, Telugu, Hindi, English, French, German, Italian, Polish, Portuguese, Brazilian, Spanish (Castilian), Spanish (Neutral), Thai, Indonesian and Vietnamese.

Marketing 
In interviews with online portals, Karthik Subbaraj expressed his disinterest on not crediting the creators of the film on its promotional posters released through Netflix's social media handles. He added that "it is the platform's policy not to include credits of the directors and other artists", which led Subbaraj to promote his own poster designs through his media sites. He further added that "it would be nice to see Netflix changes their policies in future".

A graffiti art for Jagame Thandhiram was created by graffiti artist Nme. Netflix India released the graffiti tribute video through the social media handles in May 2021, which opened to positive response from fans. Dhanush's look in the film was recreated by Medha Srivastava, a makeup artist, whose video was shared by Netflix India's social media handles, the very same month.

Amul India released a doodle which inspired a still from the film. A Twitter emoji was also unveiled ahead of the release, becoming Dhanush's first film to do so. The film's trailer was recreated by Ikorodu Bois (a group of Nigerian boys), known for recreating promos of popular web series, Money Heist and other OTT shows. Their video has been posted on their Instagram page. One day prior to the film's release, a fan from Tamil Nadu, erected a huge cutout of Dhanush. Later, stills and promotional videos from the film were showcased at the Times Square in New York.

Home media 
The satellite rights of the film were purchased by Star Vijay with the television premiere being held only after two months after its digital release. During an interview, Karthik Subbaraj said that the songs "Bujji", "Nethu" and "Aala Ola" were removed from the film's original cut to follow Netflix's guidelines and that the songs will be featured only during the television broadcast of the film.

Controversy 
Jagame Thandhiram was in the news for controversies surrounding over the release plans, whether the film was speculated to have a digital or theatrical release. Dhanush was upset over producer Sashikanth, as the latter accepted for digital release, irrespective of theatres being reopened and operated with 50% seating capacity due to the pandemic restrictions. This caused a rift between Dhanush and Sashikanth, as the producer unfollowed Dhanush in Twitter and Instagram. After the central government granted permission to increase the seating capacity in theatres, on 1 February 2021, Dhanush took to Twitter the following day, 2 February, stating the demand for theatrical release in support of theatre owners and distributors. Similarly, their fans also demanded the film's theatrical release by sticking wall posters across Tamil Nadu. However, Sashikanth continued negotiating with Netflix for digital release.

With the film's teaser released on 22 February 2021, confirming the digital release through Netflix, fans of Dhanush expressed their disappointment as they intended to watch the film in theatres, despite the teaser being positively received by fans. Dhanush decided to stay out of the film's promotional activities online, after being upset with the producer's decision for digital release, although he shared the film's trailer through his tweet expressing his unhappiness over the film releasing on Netflix and not in theatres. Similarly, YNOT Studios faced a red card from the distributors, in response to the issue, resulting in their other projects Aelay and Mandela being released through online platforms.

Reception 
The film received mixed to positive reviews from critics and audiences. Natalia Winkelman of New York Times called the screenplay (by Karthik Subbaraj) elevated the "usual crime antics by drawing attention to language, and how it can be used as a weapon or a unifier". She added that few sequences in the film feel "fresh", but called the movie's patterns "familiar". M. Suganth of The Times of India rated three of five stars for the film and called few sequences in the first half, featuring Dhanush "interesting", but criticised the slow-paced second half of the film. He also commented that "Subbaraj used the struggle of Eelam Tamils to add depth", but criticised that the attempt "does not make the scenes moving". Srivatsan S of The Hindu opined that Karthik Subbaraj wanted to have a bit of everything in the film, which is "a drama with an ultra-cool gangster (Dhanush) at the centre", "a serious political film dealing with a global issue", and "a stylishly-shot bubblegum film with a carefree attitude", but called that it "does not quite achieve the desired results".

Saibal Chatterjee of NDTV rated two-and-a-half out of five, calling that "the tedium is lessened by the ebullience of Dhanush and the solidity of Joju George". He further praised James Cosmo's performance as it "makes the most of the over-the-top quality of the larger-than-life villain". Sudhir Srinivasan of The New Indian Express called Jagame Thandhiram as "Karthik Subbaraj's weakest film", but praised the other technical aspects of the film such as music, cinematography and picturisation. He added this film as like "Karthik Subbaraj's desire to make two different Tamil films set in the West", with one, a solemn film like Iraivi that would bleed for "immigrants, refugees and Eelam Tamils". Nandini Ramanath of Scroll.in called that "overstuffed with Subbaraj's trademark flourishes, Jagame Thandhiram seeks to be something more than a gangster movie"; she praised Dhanush's performance in the film as "magnetic, as the messiah of immigrants", while also calling Cosmo as "the archvillain whose bark is worse than his bite" and George as "dignified as the Robin Hood of the British underworld".

In a contrasting review, Firstpost-based critic Ranjani Krishnakumar gave one star for the film, calling it as "confused", "self-indulgent", and "inconsiderate". She pointed that the film did not make up its mind between "being an empathetic story about xenophobia" or a "massy gangster film about a borderline psychopath", though it has "moments of both neither building on the other, ends up as a silly mess". Haricharan Pudipeddi of Hindustan Times stated that "Karthik Subaraj tried to pull a Kabali with Dhanush, but it disappoints big time". He further criticised the casting of foreign actors and the editing, being "chopped and stitched together in a way that some scenes absolutely make no sense". The News Minute editor-in-chief, Sowmya Rajendran, gave three out of five stars saying "There are some wildly fun moments in the film, but they don't add up to give us anything meaningful". Umesh Punwani of Koimoi rated two-and-a-half out of five stars and opined that the film "had the potential to define new benchmarks, but ended up choosing between its conflict".

Shubhra Gupta of The Indian Express rated two-and-a-half out of five saying, "Dhanush-in-veshti strides across sleety England streets in slo-mo, doing Rajini but wisely keeping it low key, channelling the street-smart, lovable scamp he specialises in, when not going all out gangsta familiar to us from such cracking films as Vada Chennai." Sajesh Mohan of Manorama Online gave three out of five saying "Jagame Thandhiram could not be considered equal to Pa. Ranjith's Kaala or Kabali, where the director used the popular figure of Rajinikanth and his Style Mannan avatar to drive home a political and ideological point. But it definitely will hold its place." Baradwaj Rangan of Film Companion South called the film, based on an important issue, is "flamboyantly" but "generically" made, which could have been "Suruli's coming-of-age story, about him wrapping his head around the refugee crisis". Writing for the same website, Vishal Menon called the film's "righteous self-importance just does not fit into the world it tries to build for itself".

References

External links 
 
 

2021 direct-to-video films
2021 films
Films directed by Karthik Subbaraj
Films scored by Santhosh Narayanan
Films not released in theaters due to the COVID-19 pandemic
Films postponed due to the COVID-19 pandemic
Indian direct-to-video films
Indian gangster films
Indian action thriller films
Indian crime action films
Tamil-language Netflix original films
Films shot in Rajasthan
Films shot in Madurai
Films shot in London
2021 crime action films
2021 action thriller films
Films about immigration
Films about war crimes
Films about organised crime in India